The Miss Perú 1994 pageant was held on April 10, 1994. That year, 24 candidates were competing for the national crown. The chosen winner represented Peru at the Miss Universe 1994. The rest of the finalists would enter in different pageants.

Placements

Special Awards

 Best Regional Costume - Lambayeque - Claudia Muñiz
 Miss Photogenic - Amazonas - Lidia Ferrari
 Miss Elegance - Loreto - Patricia Cabanillas
 Miss Body - Ica - Sandra Delgado
 Best Hair - Cajamarca - Cecilia Brozovich
 Miss Congeniality - Callao - Karina Calmet 
 Most Beautiful Face - Amazonas - Lidia Ferrari

.

Delegates

Amazonas - Lidia Ferrari 
Apurímac - Celia Alvarado
Arequipa - Claudia Fernández 
Ayacucho - Natalia Ruiz
Cajamarca - Cecilia Brozovich
Callao - Karina Calmet
Cuzco - Viviana Cisneros
Distrito Capital - Karoline Haffner
Huancavelica - Mónica Cabanillas
Huánuco - Giuliana Malpartida
Ica - Sandra Delgado
Junín - Maripili Barreda 
La Libertad - Sandra Otoya
Lambayeque - Claudia Muñiz
Loreto - Patricia Cabanillas
Madre de Dios - Jessica Tapia
Moquegua - Claudia Rivera
Pasco - Wendy Wunder 
Piura - Claudia Torrejón 
Puno - Luz María Chang 
San Martín - Ivette Alba
Tacna - Katherine Zugby
Tumbes - Ruber Ferrer Vitola
Ucayali - Flor de María Rivera

Trivia 
 Cecilia Brozovich celebrated her 18th birthday during the Miss Peru 1994 finals.
 Jessica Tapia became the first Latin American woman to win the Miss Asia-Pacific title.
 Lidia Ferrari was not being able to travel to participate in the Miss International pageant for undisclosed reasons.
 Viviana Cisneros was replaced by Karina Calmet, for Miss Hispanidad pageant because she had to withdraw due to a leg injury. Karina Won the pageant that year.
 The outgoing titleholder Deborah D'Souza Peixoto sported the same Evening Gown (when she crowned her successor) that Miss Amazonas 1989, Ana Rosa Vick, wore during Miss Peru 1989.

Judges
 Madeline Hartog-Bel - Miss World 1967
 Juan Giha - Peruvian shooter & Olympic medalist
 Javier Blanco - Regional Manager of San Antonio (Mineral water)
 Norka Peralta - Peruvian Designer
 Renata Reiche Neuman - President of the foundation to preserve the Nazca Lines
 Francesca Zaza - Miss Peru 1982
 Guillermo Arguedas - General Manager of Mossone Hotel
 Dr. Max Álvarez - Plastic Surgeon
 Nelly Silva - Peruvian Painter
 Jean Paul Strauss - Peruvian Singer

Background Music

Opening Show – Miss Peru Anthem (composed by Coco Tafur)
Parade of Regions – Strunz & Farah - "El Jaguar"
Swimsuit Competition – Samir Giha - "25 Boleros Medley"
Evening Gown Competition – Raul Di Blasio - "Amarraditos" & "La Flor De La Canela"

Special Guests Singers

 Elsa Maria Elejalde - "El Dia Que Te Vuelva A Besar" & "Europa"
 Guillermo Dávila - "Barco A La Deriva" & "Cuando Se Acaba El Amor"
 Francesc Picas - "Amor Por Bandera" & "Locos Por Amor"

References 

Miss Peru
1994 in Peru
1994 beauty pageants